2022 Hungarian parliamentary election
 2022 Hungarian presidential election
 2022 Hungarian LGBTQ in education referendum